Jo Linda Susenbach Kittinger (born October 7, 1955) is an Alabama native known for her many children's books and for her participation in many local, national and international organizations. She is an active member of the Leaky Pens (a bi-weekly book authors group), and SCBWI (The Society of Children's Book Writers and Illustrators). Kittinger served as a Co-Regional Advisor of the Southern Breeze chapter (Alabama, Georgia and Mississippi) of SCBWI for eleven years and now holds the rank of Regional Advisor Emeritus.

Biography
Jo Linda Susenbach Kittinger was born October 7, 1955 in Miami, Florida. She is an alumna of Vestavia Hills High School and of the University of Montevallo where she received a Bachelor of Fine Arts, summa cum laude.

Kittinger's interest in publishing began early. She was editor of her high school yearbook and began submitting original craft designs for publication shortly after college. Her projects may be found in numerous books and magazines published through Oxmoor House Books and Heritage House Publishing. Kittinger began writing for children in 1991. In addition to her books, Jo has published articles in various books and magazines including Pockets, Boys Quest and The Flicker. She has written numerous feature articles which have appeared on the Just For Kids page of the Birmingham News and a number of items for Harcourt Brace Educational Measurement and CTB/McGraw-Hill.

Kittinger has been an avid speaker over the last 10 years; speaking at everything from major conferences in the States, and as far away as Manila, Philippines, to author visits in local classrooms.
She also served as a representative of Hoover, Alabama for ten years on the board of the Mental Retardation / Developmental Disabilities Health Care Authority of Jefferson Co.,Inc., standing up for Alabama citizens who live under afflictions similar to Cerebral Palsy, which impaired her eldest son.

AwardsRosa's Bus: the Ride to Civil Rights was honored with a Crystal Kite award through the SCBWI. The House on Dirty-Third Street'' was the recipient of a Christopher Award in 2013. This picture book also received the first ever Social Justice Literature Award from the International Reading Association in 2013.

Bibliography - books published in the United States 
2019 - Light - Children's Press/Scholastic - 
2018 - South Dakota - Children's Press/Scholastic - 
2018 - Alabama - Children's Press/Scholastic - 
2014 - The Beauty of Dreams - American Bar Association Publishers - 
2013 - Helping A Hero - American Bar Association Publishers - 
2012 - A Breath of Hope - American Bar Association Publishers - 
2012 - The House on Dirty-Third Street - Peachtree Publishers -
2010 - Rosa's Bus: The Ride to Civil Rights - Calkins Creek - 
2005 - Who is George Washington Carver - Children's Press - 
2005 - Who is Jane Goodall - Children's Press - 
2004 - Moving Day - Children's Press - 
2004 - When I Grow up - Children's Press - 
2003 - A Lunch with Punch - Children's Press - 
2002 - Going to the Beach - Children's Press - 
2001 - Birds of North America West - DK Publishing, Inc. - 
2001 - Birds of North America East - DK Publishing, Inc. - 
1998 - Stories in Stone: The World of Animal Fossils - Franklin Watts Publishing - 
1998 - A look at Minerals: From Galena to Gold - Franklin Watts Publishing - 
1997 - A Look at Rocks: From Coal to Kimberlite - Franklin Watts Publishing - 
1996 - Dead Log Alive! - Franklin Watts Publishing - 
1996 - The Joy of Cats - Meadowbrook Press, Inc. -

Bibliography - books published with Korean publishers 
2014 - What Are You Drawing? - Tuntun/Unibooks, Co., Ltd., Seoul, Korea -
2014 - Time For Lunch - Tuntun/Unibooks, Co., Ltd., Seoul, Korea -
2014 - It is Showtime! - Tuntun/Unibooks, Co., Ltd., Seoul, Korea -
2013 - I Want To Be an Inventor - Tuntun/Unibooks, Co., Ltd., Seoul, Korea -
2012 - I Jump Up, I Come Back Down - Tuntun/Unibooks, Co., Ltd., Seoul, Korea -
2012 - The Boy Who Cried Wolf - Tuntun/Unibooks, Co., Ltd., Seoul, Korea -

Birmingham News articles by Jo Kittinger
"Plan the Perfect Staycation," June 7, 2009
"Just Like NO ONE Used to Make," April 22, 2009
"Christmas Around the World," December 21, 2008
"A Primer to the Week's Holidays," December 21, 2008
""Spring Break Adventures" March 13, 2008
For Easter Fun, Think Outside the Basket" March 8, 2008
"Mom's Little Helpers," December 11, 2007

"New Twist on Old Yarns," September 15, 2007
"Fun at Camp Papa" August 2, 2007
"Annual Rodeo Rounds Up Fish and Fun" May 31, 2007
"Get in the Swim" May 24, 2007
"Festival a Throwback to Negro League Baseball" April 12, 2007
"The Drama of Equalization" January 25, 2007
"
Worm learning Hemphill students get to heart (5) of the matter
Birmingham News (Alabama), January 11, 2007 Thursday, LIFESTYLE; Pg. 8E, 683 words, JO KITTINGER For The Birmingham News
Annual rodeo rounds up FISH and FUN FISHING IN THE PARK Annual East Lake Family Fishing Rodeo lures young anglers / XX
Birmingham News (Alabama), May 31, 2007 Thursday, LIFESTYLE; Pg. 8E, 505 words, JO S. KITTINGER For The Birmingham News
GET IN THE SWIM! (or other summer activity) With all that's going on, there's no time for boredom; fun is just a registration form away
Birmingham News (Alabama), May 24, 2007 Thursday, LIFESTYLE; Pg. 8E, 1504 words, JO S. KITTINGER For The Birmingham News
BLACK DIAMONDS Baseball fans in for treat as former Negro League players tell their stories
Birmingham News (Alabama), April 12, 2007 Thursday, LIFESTYLE; Pg. 8E, 707 words, JO S. KITTINGER For The Birmingham News
The drama of equalization Director's life experience leads to an honored play
Birmingham News (Alabama), January 25, 2007 Thursday, LIFESTYLE; Pg. 8E, 447 words, JO S. KITTINGER For The Birmingham News
'That Fat Cat' inspires scholarship program
Birmingham News (Alabama), December 28, 2006 Thursday, LIFESTYLE; Pg. 10E, 466 words, JO S. KITTINGER For The Birmingham News
The price of ice Local figure-skating pair take the spills in stride
Birmingham News (Alabama), November 9, 2006 Thursday, LIFESTYLE; Pg. 8E, 625 words, JO S. KITTINGER For The Birmingham News
AMAZING MAZE Teen triplets help parents make Columbiana maze Teen triplets help parents create twisting, turning fall fun in Columbiana
Birmingham News (Alabama), October 5, 2006 Thursday, LIFESTYLE; Pg. 8E, 513 words, JO S. KITTINGER For The Birmingham News
Migrating monarchs headed our way Colorful butterflies pretty but poisonous
Birmingham News (Alabama), September 7, 2006 Thursday, LIFESTYLE; Pg. 8E, 495 words, JO S. KITTINGER For The Birmingham News
Get ready to wiggle! Lovable preschool kids' band to stop here July 28
Birmingham News (Alabama), July 20, 2006 Thursday, LIFESTYLE; Pg. 8E, 446 words, JO S. KITTINGER For The Birmingham News
Cash in on Fun
Birmingham News (Alabama), June 29, 2006 Thursday, LIFESTYLE; Pg. 8E, 312 words, JO S. KITTINGER For The Birmingham News
Dora sets sail for adventure Dora the Explorer sets sail for adventure at BJCC next week
Birmingham News (Alabama), February 9, 2006 Thursday, LIFESTYLE; Pg. 10E, 212 words, JO S. KITTINGER For The Birmingham News
Disney on Ice comes to life Popular princesses and their loves discover whole new world in Magic City
Birmingham News (Alabama), November 3, 2005 Thursday, LIFESTYLE; Pg. 8E, 437 words, JO S. KITTINGER For The Birmingham News
Soaring to new heights Flight museum's classes take off, teach how airplanes work
Birmingham News (Alabama), October 13, 2005 Thursday, LIFESTYLE; Pg. 8E, 496 words, JO S. KITTINGER for The Birmingham News

Newspaper references of Jo Kittinger
December 7, 2005: Wednesday, "City resident finds way to talk to kids - in books", COMMUNITY NEWS; Pg. 4H, 678 words, JEREMY GRAY News staff writer
LECTURES/ LITERARY
Birmingham News (Alabama), April 27, 2007 Friday, LIFESTYLE; Pg. 33G, 450 words
CALENDAR - LOOKING AHEAD EVENTS
Birmingham News (Alabama), April 20, 2007 Friday, LIFESTYLE; Pg. 34G, 2918 words

References

External links 

 Jo Kittinger's website
 The Society of Children's Book Writers and Illustrators
 In a December, 2009 interview
 interview by Patricia Newman on her blog August 2013, also appeared in California Kids

1955 births
Living people
American children's writers
Writers from Miami
People from Vestavia Hills, Alabama
University of Montevallo alumni